James O'Gorman may refer to:

James Myles O'Gorman (1804–1874), Irish-born bishop of the Catholic Church in the United States
James Aloysius O'Gorman (1860–1943), United States Senator from New York
James F. O'Gorman (born 1933), American architectural historian, taught at Wellesley College

See also
O'Gorman